Keltec or KELTEC may refer to:
 Keltec, a subsidiary of Crane Holdings
 Kerala Hitech Industries Limited, a general engineering work centre in India
 Kel-Tec, an American firearms manufacturer